Žuvela is a Croatian surname.

It is the second most common surname in the Dubrovnik-Neretva County of Croatia.

People with the name include:

Chris Zuvela (born 1997), Australian footballer of Croatian descent
Domenica Žuvela (born 1992), Croatian singer
Goran Žuvela (born 1948), Croatian judoka

References

Croatian surnames